Luna Pearl Woolf is an American composer. Her works include opera, chamber music, orchestra, and choral compositions. Many of her pieces incorporate spoken-word recitals and choreography as well as musical performances. 
As a composer of many different works including operas, dramatic chamber music, silent film scores, and musical story-telling, she’s been commissioned by organizations such as Carnegie Hall, Washington National Opera, Minnesota Sinfonia, Salle Bourgie, ECM+, and others. She has collaborated with many artists including Joyce DiDonato, Frederica von Stade, Daniel Taylor, Lisa Delan, Christopher O’Riley, the Brentano String Quartet, the Russian National Orchestra, and Jeremy Irons amongst many others.

Woolf has created commissioned pieces for Carnegie Hall and the Washington National Opera. In 2014 she was an inaugural recipient of Opera America's first grant for female composers.

She is married to cellist Matt Haimovitz.

Biography 
Luna Pearl Woolf was born in 1973 in Western Massachusetts. She received a Bachelor of Arts from Harvard University, graduating Summa Cum Laude in music composition in 1996, and a Master of Arts from Smith College in music composition.

Woolf's principal composition teachers have been Mario Davidovsky, Augusta Read Thomas, Lewis Spratlan and Don Wheelock. Woolf was awarded the Ellen Taafe Zwilich Prize from the IAWM, the John Greene Scholarship and John Knowles Paine Fellowship from Harvard University, and the Settie Lehman Fatman Prize from Smith College.

She is married to virtuoso cellist, Uccello member and frequent musical collaborator Matt Haimovitz, and currently resides with him in Montreal, Canada.

Oxingale Records 
Luna Pearl Woolf along with her husband, Matt Haimowitz, created the label Oxingale Records, a sub-label of PENTATONE, in 2000. The label was planned to publish their own original music, but in 2015 expanded its catalogue to release the music of other classical artists. The project also includes Oxingale Music, which is the publishing side of the label.

Critical responses

The Pillar, Angel Heart 
This opera was first performed in September 2014 with narration by actor Jeremy Irons, with words from Cornelia Funke.

The New York Times writes: “Ms. Woolf’s atmospheric music serves a different purpose… her compositions add psychological nuances and emotional depth through ever-changing textures. The … ensemble produces a dazzling variety of sounds, from the rich and earthy to the ethereal.”

Entanglement 
Entanglement is a composition for a cello and percussion duo that was inspired by Melange a Trois, an “instrumental theatre work that featured percussionist Krystina Marcoux who used the body of a cello for her instrument”. The piece was written for one player that bowed the cello, and another that struck and caressed the cello.

 The Calgary Herald says, “the cello is bowed by one player and struck and caressed by the other, it appears that Sandvoss suddenly is using four arms to play, giving the instrument a sensual quality, perhaps best summarized as an opera aria for cello, entangling a dramatic theatricality and an erotic intimacy between instrument and performer(s)”
 “carefully considered the relationship of physicality to the performers’ bodies, for example their height, physical performance characteristics and their physical relationship with the instrument. Set in shards of imitative Bach cello suite fragments, and buttressed with non-tonal impressionistic properties, both percussive or spectral, the discontinuous narrative was something to be experienced, and far less so to be analyzed”

Notable works
Entanglement is a piece for cello and percussion which also requires the musicians to follow a series of choreographed movements.
The Pillar is an opera dealing with the life of Bernard Madoff.
Angel Heart: A Musical Storybook is a spoken-word piece written in collaboration with Cornelia Funke and narrated by Jeremy Irons.
Better Gods is an opera dealing with the abdication of Liliʻuokalani.

Discography
 2008 - And if the song be worth a smile. Performed by Kristin Pankonin (piano), Matt Haimovitz (cello), Susanne Mentzer (mezzo-soprano), Lisa Delan (soprano). PENTATONE. Compact Disc.
 2013 - The Hours Begin to Sing. Performed by Lisa Delan (soprano). PENTATONE. Compact Disc.
 2015 - DECEMBER CELEBRATION New Carols by Seven American Composers. Performed by Lisa Delan (soprano), Lester Lynch (baritone), Steven Bailey (piano), Dawn Harms (conductor), Musicians of the New Century Chamber Orchestra, Volti Chorus. PENTATONE. Compact Disc.
 2015 - "Orbit" Music for solo cello (1945-2014). Performed by Matt Haimovitz (cello). PENTATONE/Oxingale Records. Compact Disc.
 2016 - Overtures to Bach. Performed by Matt Haimovitz (cello). PENTATONE/Oxingale Records. Compact Disc.
 2018 - Angel Heart. English version. Performed by Lisa Delan (soprano), Matt Haimovitz (cello), Jeremy Irons (narrator), Zheng Cao (mezzo-soprano), Caterina Lichtenberg (mandolin), Mike Marshall (mandolin), Michael Morgan (conductor), Daniel Taylor (counter-tenor), Sanford Sylvan (baritone), Uccello, Children’s Choir of St. Martin de Porres School in West Oakland. Based on text from Cornelia Funke. PENTATONE/Oxingale Records. Compact Disc.
 2019 - Ein Engel in der Nacht" (Angel Heart). German version. Performed by Frederica von Stade (soprano), Matt Haimovitz (cello), Jeremy Irons (narrator), Zheng Cao (mezzo-soprano), Caterina Lichtenberg (mandolin), Mike Marshall (mandolin), Michael Morgan (conductor), Daniel Taylor (counter-tenor), Sanford Sylvan (baritone), Uccello, Children’s Choir of St. Martin de Porres School in West Oakland. Based on text from Cornelia Funke. PENTATONE/Oxingale Records. Compact Disc.
 2020 - Luna Pearl Woolf: Fire and Flood performed by: Choir of Trinity Wall Street / Matt Haimovitz / Novus NY / Julian Wachner. Nominated for 2020 Best Compendium Grammy Award. Compact Disc, 16 bit and hi res digital download (24bit, DSD - Native DSD).

References

External links
Official website of Luna Pearl Woolf

21st-century American composers
21st-century American women musicians
Women opera composers
Living people
Place of birth missing (living people)
Year of birth missing (living people)
Smith College alumni
Harvard College alumni
21st-century women composers